The Wendefurth Dam near Wendefurth in the Harz is one of the dams downstream of the Rappbode Dam, that provides flood protection as well as impounding the River Bode to provide the lower reservoir for the Wendefurth Power Station. In addition it is a bathing lake and also supports fish farming.

Dam wall 
The individual segments of the dam are sealed on the upstream side with copper sheets set into the concrete. In addition the joints are sealed with tar and hemp. The flexure of the individual segments under water pressure is constantly monitored. By means of pendulums suspended on the dam wall the degree of flex can be measures. The movement of segments relative to one another is also under constant observation. The wall has several galleries for inspection purposes. Two bottom outlets have been installed at the base. It is currently being investigated whether the water outflow can be used for energy purposes.

The bedrock consists of manganese slate that is not particularly watertight. So that the dam wall is not lifted up from underneath by water pressure at the base, the pressure at the foot is relieved by over 40 bubble caps (Glocken) with drainage pipes (Steigleitungen). The building water pressure is measured at intervals. By means of the observation well, the long term condition of the mountain is investigated.

The operator, the Saxony-Anhalt Dam Company (Talsperrenbetrieb Sachsen-Anhalt), has made the Wendefurth Dam accessible to visitors. In an adjacent engineering park, old dam components are given a final use.

There is a good viewing point over the dam and reservoir at Talsperrenblick on the hillside beyond the eastern end of the reservoir, accessible on footpaths from Wendefurth. It is checkpoint 62 in the Harzer Wandernadel hiking system.

See also 
 List of dams in the Harz
 List of reservoirs and dams in Germany

Sources 
 Talsperren in Sachsen-Anhalt. Talsperrenmeisterei des Landes Sachsen-Anhalt, 1994

External links 

 Wendefurth Dam at en.structurae.de 
 Saxony-Anhalt Dam Company 
 Wendefurth Dam 

Dams in Saxony-Anhalt
Dams in the Harz
Buildings and structures in Harz (district)
Dams completed in 1966